The Piggott School is a Church of England academy secondary school in Wargrave in Berkshire, England. The school has approximately 1,516 pupils and around 185 teaching staff. The school specialises in Modern Languages and Humanities. It has been awarded International school status by the British Council. The most recent inspection from Ofsted achieved an overall effectiveness rating of 'Good'.

The Piggott School has a long established exchange programme with the Ville-Gymnasium School der Erftstadt, North Rhine-Westphalia, Germany, and other programmes with I.E.S. Las Canteras in Collado Villalba near Madrid, Spain, and with Lycée Jean Guéhenno, France. It is a partner school of the EU organised Comenius project. The Piggott School is also the only church of England secondary school in the Reading, Twyford area. The Piggott School is one of the best performing secondary schools in the Wokingham District.

History
The Piggott School was founded by Robert Piggott, a philanthropist, to cater for 20 poor boys and 20 poor girls in separate schools. The foundation stone was laid on 12 October 1939 it was officially opened on 17 September 1940. The school was originally built for 320 children. When was opened in 1940, it was already too small because war had broken out and an evacuation programme was underway (two million children were moved from London to the countryside within three days). This caused a doubling of the local population of children and far more pupils had to be accommodated by the school. Morning school was therefore organised for 'home' children. Afternoon school was for the 'visitors'.

Recent and future changes

Since becoming an academy, there have been changes to the new site. In 2011, a new sixth form block was opened to replace the old sixth form block (now used as a drama studio and extra classroom). A purpose-built gym was constructed on the site of the old Maths and Business Studies terrapins.

Houses

The four houses are:

St Patricks 
Thames 
Kennet 
Loddon 

Loddon house is named after the River Loddon in Berkshire and Hampshire. The emblem is a Lion.
Thames house is named after the River Thames which runs through several cities and towns, the emblem is a dragon.
Kennet house is named after the River Kennet which runs through Reading, the emblem is a green dragon.
St Patrick's house is named after St Patrick's Stream, a backwater of the Thames that flows into the Loddon, the emblem is a harp.
The current school sweatshirt (since 2011) comes with the school house; the logo can be red for Thames, blue for St Patricks, green for Kennet, and yellow for Loddon. There are competitions between the houses, including rugby, football, netball, hockey, sports day and the governors' cup.

Church Status
The Piggott School is a school with a Church Foundation.

Ofsted
The school is high-achieving in results, OfSTED and SIAMS inspections.

In its latest Ofsted inspection, carried out 29–30 November 2017, the school achieved the following ratings:

Facilities
The Piggott School has a soldering works area, clay area, modelling areas such as DIY, a Arts Studio and a large sports field which runs alongside the railway tracks towards Wargrave railway station. In 2011 a new sixth form block was opened. A new block, similar to that of the sixth form building, was constructed in mid 2013. This contains a mixture of Maths and science facilities and a gym.

Curriculum
In Years 7 and 8 (Key Stage 3) students study the core subjects of English, Mathematics and Science (Year 9 start GCSE Science) plus the following foundation subjects: French, Design and Technology, Information and Communication Technology (ICT), History, Geography, Religious Education, Art, Music, Drama and Physical Education. Lessons are offered in Personal, Social and Health Education and Citizenship. In addition to French, pupils either study German, Spanish or Mandarin Chinese as a second language. The following Design and Technology options are offered at GCSE: Food and Nutrition; Graphic Products; Resistant Materials; Systems and Control; Textiles.

AS Art, Craft and Design is also available as a fast track course for students in year 10 and 11.
In Years 9, 10 and 11 students are able to specialise in Catering, Graphic Products, Textiles, Resistant Materials, Electronic Products or Food.
Sixth formers can study the following courses in AS & A2 are food technology, AQA theatre studies, music, AQA geography, OCR history, AQA maths and languages (French, Spanish or German). Students can also study at AS and A level which are ICT, product design (graphic products or textile technology), economics, science (students are able to take one or more of the three separate sciences, these are biology, physics, chemistry), business studies, art and photography.

In addition, a number of vocational courses are available including the new Key Skills Qualifications in Application of Number, Communication, and Information Technology, and the National Diploma in Business (Level 2). The Piggott School's participates in the Cisco Networking Academy Programme and is one of the relatively few schools in the UK to offer this globally accepted professional course in networking. Pupils on this course have networked the computers in the school's IT suite and also those of the neighbouring primary school Robert Piggott Junior in Wargrave, Berkshire.

The Piggott School's has pioneered a science buddy scheme, which was featured on Teachernet. The scheme involved around 30 pupils from the top three sets in Year 11 helping the younger children in Year 7 to conduct experiments and investigations in a lunchtime club.

Sports
Pupils at the school participate in the following sports: cross-country, badminton, basketball, cricket, football, health-related fitness, hockey, netball, rounders, rugby, athletics, table tennis and tennis. There are school teams which play regular fixtures with other local schools in rugby, football, hockey, netball and basketball. Pupils also participate in the Reading Cross Country League. A number of pupils play at county level.

Extracurricular activities

Pupils can learn to play instruments such as woodwind. There is also a School Band and Choir. Drama productions have ranged from well-known musicals to exam performances presented by students studying GCSE and A levels.

Admission
In common with all other schools in Wokingham Borough, school places are allocated by the LEA based on designated catchment areas and feeder primary schools. Around 200 places are available at Piggott every year. The feeder primary schools for Piggott are:

Colleton Primary School
Crazies Hill CofE Primary School
Polehampton CofE Junior School
Robert Piggott CofE Junior School
Sonning CofE Primary School
Knowl Hill CofE Primary School
Charvil Piggott Primary School

Note: St. Johns C of E Aided Primary School is no longer a feeder school for the Piggott School.

Academy
On Friday 1 July 2011, The Piggott School became an academy after being approved by the Department of Education. The letter sent out to parents saying the school would become an academy on 1 July was sent out on Monday, 4 July.

Primary school

In 2013 it was announced that the Piggott school will be opening a primary school in Charvil. This has now been opened and named Charvil Piggott Primary.

Controversy

In 2015, maths teacher Mark Wade was fired by the school following allegations of an inappropriate relationship with a female student. In 2016 he was banned from teaching for life by the National College for Teaching and Leadership after their investigation concluded that he had consensual sex with a female former student, and had engaged in an inappropriate relationship with her, which included kissing, while she was still a student.

In 2017 the school gained national attention after outlining a range of cost-cutting measures intended to achieve savings of £200,000. These included staff redundancies, phasing out of some subjects, and increasing fees for school trips.

References

Further reading
 Pam Haseltine, The Piggott School: Wargrave: a profile, (Twyford & Ruscombe Local History Society, c1986) 

Educational institutions established in 1940
Academies in the Borough of Wokingham
1940 establishments in England
Secondary schools in the Borough of Wokingham